Kisrin or Ḳisrin may refer to one of the following:

 Caesarea Maritima
 Caesarea Philippi
 Katzrin